In the 2010-11 season, Al Shorta competed in the Iraqi Premier League, which at the time was called the Iraqi Elite League. They attempted to win the league, but as a result of losing many of their key players, they found themselves battling to avoid relegation to the lower division. They survived on goal difference, one place ahead of relegated Al Mosul, by defeating Al Naft on the last day of the season thanks to a brace from their key player, Amjad Kalaf.

Squad 

 (3rd captain)

 (captain)

 (vice-captain)

Kit 
Supplier: Adidas

Transfers

In

Out

Matches

Iraqi Elite League

First Stage (North Group)

References

External links 
 Al Shorta website
 Al Shorta TV
 Team info at goalzz.com

Al Shorta
Al-Shorta SC seasons

ar:نادي الشرطة العراقي
ca:Al-Shorta FC Bagdad
es:Al-Shorta
fr:Police Club (Bagdad)
it:Al-Shorta Football Club
nl:Al Shorta